South Maclean is a rural locality in the City of Logan, Queensland, Australia. In the  South Maclean had a population of 1,362 people.

Geography
North Maclean is on the Mount Lindesay Highway with the Logan River as part of its northern and southern boundaries as well as passing through the locality. North Maclean is immediately to the north of South Maclean. A small section of South Maclean's western border aligns with the Sydney–Brisbane rail corridor.

History

In 1997, the locality of Maclean was replaced by North and South Maclean; prior to this date, they have shared history.

Formerly in the Shire of Beaudesert, South Maclean became part of Logan City following the local government amalgamations in March 2008.

At the  South Maclean had a population of 1,255.

In the  South Maclean had a population of 1,362 people.

On 29 September 2017, South Maclean was extended eastward taking land from the west of Jimboomba as part of creating the new localities of Riverbend and Glenlogan.

See also

 North Maclean which has a shared history

References

External links

 

Suburbs of Logan City
Localities in Queensland